Sounds So Good is the debut album of American country music artist Ashton Shepherd. The album was released on March 4, 2008, via MCA Nashville Records. The album has produced two singles: "Takin' Off This Pain", which reached number 20 on Billboard Hot Country Songs, and the title track, which reached number 21. Shepherd wrote or co-wrote all but one of the tracks.

Track listing

Chart performance

Album
The album debuted and peaked at number 16 on the Top Country Albums chart, and number 90 on the Billboard 200 selling less than 10,000 copies in the United States.

Singles

Personnel
Wyatt Beard – background vocals
Buddy Cannon – acoustic guitar, background vocals
Chad Cromwell – drums
Dan Dugmore – steel guitar
Kevin "Swine" Grantt – bass guitar
Kenny Greenberg – electric guitar
John Jorgenson – electric guitar
Shelby Kennedy – background vocals
B. James Lowry – acoustic guitar, 12-string guitar
Randy McCormick – piano, Hammond organ, Wurlitzer electric piano, synthesizer
Larry Paxton – bass guitar
Gary Prim – piano
John Wesley Ryles – background vocals
Scotty Sanders - steel guitar
Ashton Shepherd - lead vocals
Joe Spivey - fiddle, mandolin
Scott Vestal - banjo
Chip Young – acoustic guitar

References

2008 debut albums
MCA Records albums
Ashton Shepherd albums
Albums produced by Buddy Cannon